Mary Frances Schervier, TOSF (3 January 1819 – 14 December 1876) was the founder of two religious congregations of religious sisters of the Third Order Regular of St. Francis, both committed to serving the neediest of the poor. One, the Poor Sisters of St. Francis, is based in her native Germany, and the other, the Franciscan Sisters of the Poor, was later formed from its province in the United States. She was beatified by the Catholic Church in 1974.

Early life
Frances Schervier was born into a wealthy family in Aachen, Germany.  Her father, Johann Heinrich Schervier, was a wealthy needle factory owner and the vice-mayor of Aachen.  Her French mother, Maria Louise Migeon, the goddaughter of Emperor Francis I of Austria, provided a strict home environment.  After the death of both her mother and two sisters from tuberculosis when she was thirteen, Schervier became the homemaker for her father, and developed a reputation for generosity to the poor, from her growing awareness of their desperate conditions.
 
In a dispute over the rights of the Catholic Church in 1837 (Kölner Wirren), the Prussian government imprisoned the Archbishop of Cologne, Clemens August von Droste-Vischering, causing a great public reaction; the repercussion was a revival of religious spirit, especially in Westphalia and the Rhine country. In the wake of this spiritual awakening, some prominent Aachen ladies started a society for the relief of the poor and approached Schervier's father, Johann, to permit Schervier to join. He agreed at first, but later demurred when she began to nurse the sick in their homes, fearing that she might carry the disease into his own house. Joseph Istas, who was curate at Saint Paul Parish in Aachen and founder of "Saint John's Kitchen" for the poor, deeply impressed Schervier, who began to work very closely with him; but their friendship ended abruptly with Istas' premature death in 1843. The following year she and four other young ladies (Catherine Daverkosen, Gertrude Frank, Joanna Bruchhans, and Catherine Lassen) became president members of the Third Order of St. Francis.

Founder
In 1845 Schervier's life took an unexpected turn: her father died and a family friend, Getrude Frank, told Schervier that she was called to serve God and He would show her in whose company. She considered joining the Trappistines, but instead of entering an existing convent, on 3 October 1845 she and four other women left their homes to establish a religious community devoted to caring for the poor under Schervier's leadership. With the permission of a priest, they went to live together in a small house beyond St. James's Gate, and Schervier was chosen superior of the community. The life of the Sisters was conventual, and their time spent in religious exercises, household duties, and caring for the sick poor. They formed the nucleus of the community that became known as the Poor Sisters of St. Francis.

From 1845 until 1848, the Sisters continued to care for the sick in their homes and to operate a soup kitchen. They also cared for prostitutes in their own small home and nursed women suffering from syphilis. Relying entirely upon donations for support, the Sisters experienced extreme poverty. The pre-revolutionary potato and grain failures and the refusal of some benefactors to continue their assistance once the Sisters began ministering to prostitutes, intensified their difficulties. More women joined the group in 1849, expanding the ministry beyond Aachen; not only did they care for victims of cholera, smallpox, typhoid fever, and cancer, but they also supervised women prisoners at the Aachen prison and assisted them in finding employment after their release.

The congregation obtained formal church recognition from the local bishop on 2 July 1851, despite some authorities' objections to Schervier's severe position regarding personal poverty. Soon after receiving formal recognition as a religious congregation, they spread their service overseas. An American foundation was established within seven years, to serve German emigrant communities in New York, New Jersey, Ohio, and northern Kentucky. At the same time Schervier oversaw the foundation of several hospitals and sanatoria in both Europe and the United States for those suffering from tuberculosis, then a widespread cause of death, especially among the working classes.

In 1857, she encouraged Philip Hoever, a Franciscan tertiary, in his efforts to establish the Poor Brothers of St. Francis. Like the Sisters, they are a religious congregation of lay brothers of the Franciscan Third Order Regular, instituted for charitable work among orphan boys and educating the youth of the poorer classes.

Schervier visited the United States in 1863, and helped her Sisters nurse soldiers wounded in the American Civil War. St. Mary Hospital in Hoboken, New Jersey, was founded for this work. She visited the United States one more time in 1868. During this second visit, she attended the dedication of the new location of the St. Elizabeth Hospital in Covington, Kentucky, staffed by twelve sisters of her congregation.

Legacy
When Schervier died, there were 2,500 members of her congregation worldwide. The number kept growing until the 1970s, when, like many other religious orders, they began to experience a sharp decline in membership. After a formal investigation into her life requested of the Holy See by the Archbishop of Cincinnati and the declaration of a miraculous cure of a man in Ohio, Schervier was beatified in 1974 by Pope Paul VI.

In 1959, the American province of the congregation separated from the German branch, to become an independent congregation called the Franciscan Sisters of the Poor. They have their headquarters in Brooklyn, New York. They are still engaged in operating a hospital and a home for the aged in Walden, New York, but have transferred the ownership of many of their institutions to other organizations. The Frances Schervier Home and Hospital was founded by the Sisters in the Bronx, New York, and named in her honor. (It too has been transferred as of 2000 to a medical chain but continues to operate under this name.) Currently this Congregation focuses on health care, pastoral ministries, and social service.

Veneration
Frances Schervier died in Aachen, Germany, on December 14, 1876.

In 1934 the Apostolic Process was opened in Rome, Decree issued for Introduction of the Cause of Mary Frances Schervier, of the Third Order Regular of Saint Francis. On January 30, 1969, Pope Paul VI proclaimed the "heroicity of the virtues" of Schervier and declared her "Venerable".

On October 18, 1972, Pope Paul VI, on appeal by the Right Rev. Johannes Pohlschneider, Bishop of Aachen, grants an apostolic dispensation from the prescript contained in Canon 2117 of the 1917 Code of Canon Law, so that, after a legally valid verification and full examination of only one miracle, the cause might pass to the next phase.

In 1973 the "medically inexplicable" and sudden cure of Mr. Ludwig Braun from a life-threatening pancreatic and intestinal ailment was recognized as the miracle necessary for the beatification of Schervier. The decree recognizing the miracle was signed on October 18, 1973, by Pope Paul VI. Schervier was beatified on April 28, 1974, in Rome by Pope Paul VI, and became "Blessed Frances".

In March 1989 an unexplainable and sudden cure was experienced by Mr. Thomas Siemers, who had a massive brain hemorrhage. Three medical doctors had no scientific explanation: one said it was "divine intervention" and another said "somebody up there likes him."

In 2008 The Cause for Canonization of Blessed Frances Schervier was introduced in Rome on July 16 jointly by Sister Tiziana Merletti, S.F.P., Congregational Minister of the Franciscan Sisters of the Poor, and Sister Katharina Maria Finken, S.P.S.F., Superior General of the Poor Sisters of St. Francis.

In 2009 The Opening Session of the Diocesan Inquiry Process took place on April 17 in Cincinnati, Ohio, to gather evidence on the cure of Mr. Thomas Siemers, with a closing session on December 14.

On March 17, 2010, the official documents from the Diocesan Inquiry in Cincinnati were opened in Rome.

See also
Franciscan Sisters of the Poor
Poor Sisters of St. Francis

References

Sources

External links
 Franciscan Sisters of the Poor
 Blessed Frances
 Franciscan Sisters of the Poor Foundation
 Suore Francescane dei Poveri 
 Armen-Schwestern des hl. Franziskus 

1819 births
1876 deaths
Italian beatified people
Founders of Catholic religious communities
Third Order Regular Franciscans
Franciscan beatified people
19th-century venerated Christians
People from Aachen
German beatified people
19th-century German Roman Catholic nuns
American Civil War nurses
American women nurses
American beatified people